Ben Hozie is an American film director and musician. He is the vocalist and guitarist for the band BODEGA. He is best known for his work on PVT Chat.

Career

Ben Hozie directed his first film Annunciation in 2011 (released 2014). Annunciation is an adaptation of the early northern renaissance Mérode Altarpiece triptych. The film also features footage of Occupy Wall Street. His second feature film, The Lion's Den (2017), is an experimental political farce about a group of Staten Island radicals who kidnap a wall street banker. His third film, PVT Chat (2020), starring Peter Vack and Julia Fox, premiered at the Fantasia International Film Festival. The film is an erotic drama that has received positive reviews for its unusual combination of film noir, romantic comedy, and bold depiction of unsimulated male masturbation.

Filmography

Discography

Studio albums
Endless Scroll
Shiny New Model

References

External links
 

Year of birth missing (living people)
Living people
American film directors
American film producers
American punk rock musicians
20th-century American guitarists
American male guitarists
20th-century American male musicians